Come Fly the Dragon is a 1993 Hong Kong action comedy film directed by Eric Tsang and starring Andy Lau and Tony Leung. Lau and Leung, alongside co-star Michael Miu, were three of the Five Tiger Generals of TVB in the 1980s.

Plot
Taiwan's uprising gang leader Lee Yan-chak uses violence to wipe out Taiwan's competing forces and won Asia's largest arms smuggling market. Because the smuggling group is powerfully armed, the military decided to set up a special group, where the leader chooses fighting pilots Chow Chun-kit and Lau Ka-lun to be trained by Colonel Ng. Kit was sent undercover to investigate on Lee's evidence of crime. Subsequently, Lee's men notices Kit. Lee also notices Kit's hale personality and takes him under his wing. In a choice of his task and his personal relationship, Kit chose task as the main importance and assisted the Special Force in infiltrating the arms base, while Lee plays dead and escapes from the law.

Cast
Andy Lau as Chow Chun-kit
Tony Leung Chiu-Wai as Lau Ka-lun
Fennie Yuen as Lee Wai-kuen
Michael Miu as Chiu
Frankie Chan as Lee Yan-chak
Shing Fui-On as Lee Yan-chak's henchman
Norman Chui as Colonel Ng
Ben Lam as Leung Wai-man
Lee Chi-hei as Lee Kwok-man
Chui Sing-yee as Sze Hon
Choi Chung-chau
Lam Kai-man
Tsang Man-cheong
Chan Yiu-wing
Chu Kwan-yeung
Lam Kwong-chun

Theme song
Happy Monkey (開心的馬騮)
Composer: Wong Cheuk-wing
Lyricist: Lin Xi
Singer: Andy Lau

Box office
The film grossed HK$6,878,943 at the Hong Kong box office during its theatrical run from 15 to 29 April 1993 in Hong Kong.

See also
Andy Lau filmography

External links

Come Fly the Dragon at Hong Kong Cinemagic

Come Fly the Dragon film review at LoveHKFilm.com

1993 films
1993 martial arts films
1993 action comedy films
Hong Kong action comedy films
Hong Kong martial arts films
Martial arts comedy films
Gun fu films
Police detective films
1990s Cantonese-language films
Films directed by Eric Tsang
Films set in Taiwan
Films shot in Taiwan
1990s Hong Kong films